The Fatuha–Tilaiya line is a railway line connecting Fatuha on the Howrah–Delhi main line and  on the Gaya–Kiul line both in the Indian state of Bihar. The line was earlier known as Fatuha–Islampur line.  A small portion of the line from Islampur to Natesar opened for use in 2020.

History
Futwah–Islampur Light Railway was a -wide narrow-gauge railway laid by Martin's Light Railways in 1922. Nearly 14 km of the -long Fatuha–Islampur railway line was washed away by floods 1976. As a result, no train plied on the route for many years. In 1982, Martin's Light Railways initiated resumption of train service on this line and took up restoration work. However, in 1984, they decided to close down permanently.

It was nationalised and taken over by Indian Railways in 1986. Nitish Kumar, then the railway minister laid the foundation stone for the new  railway line in 1998. This section has about 144 bridges and 36 level crossings. Hilsa will be the crossing station of this single line section. It was inaugurated in 2003 by Nitish Kumar.

The East Central Railway took up the laying of new lines in the -long Rajgir–Hisua-Tilaiya–Nateswar–Islampur sector and as of 2013 the work was in an advanced stage. Construction of the  Tilaiya sector has also been taken up. The new electrified section of Islampur to Natesar was opened in 2020.

Electrification
Feasibility studies for the electrification of the Manpur–Tilaiya–Kiul sector and Fatwa–Islampur–Bakhtiyarpur–Rajgir sectors were announced in the rail budget for 2010–11. The Fatuha Islampur line was electrified in 2019 while Islampur Natesar electrified section opened in 2020.

References

External links
Trains at Fatuha
Trains at Islampur

|

5 ft 6 in gauge railways in India
Railway lines in Bihar

Railway lines opened in 2003
2003 establishments in Bihar